Josué Soto Martínez (born December 22, 1995) is an American professional soccer player who last played as a defender for USL Championship club Austin Bold.

Career
Soto played collegiately at California Baptist University in Riverside, California, where he earned All-PacWest honorable mention honors following his freshman season. Born in Perris, California, Soto attended nearby Martin Luther King High School in Riverside, where he was a four-year starter at forward for the Wolves. In 2016, the California native played with the Querétaro U-20 side, helping the club to a U-20 championship. Soto spent two-plus seasons on loan to Cimarrones de Sonora of the Ascenso MX, where he appeared in 51 matches and logging 3,529 minutes of play.

On February 5, 2019, Austin Bold FC announced that they had loaned Soto from Querétaro FC for the rest of 2019.

References

External links

Josué Soto at Austin Bold FC's website

1995 births
Living people
American soccer players
Association football defenders
Soccer players from California
American sportspeople of Mexican descent
Ascenso MX players
USL Championship players
Cimarrones de Sonora players
Austin Bold FC players
American expatriate soccer players
American expatriate sportspeople in Mexico
Expatriate footballers in Mexico
California Baptist Lancers men's soccer players